Smog is a form of air pollution.

Smog or SMOG may also refer to:

 SMOG, a measure of readability
 SMOG (literary group), an informal group of young Soviet poets
 Smog (band), a moniker used by musician Bill Callahan
 Smog, a 1962 film by Franco Rossi
 Smog (1973 film), a 1973 TV film by Wolfgang Petersen
 SMOG, a fictional organization (Scientific Measurement Of Ghosts) in "The Living Dead" episode of The Avengers (TV series)
 Smog (1/3), a sculpture by Tony Smith
 Theatrical smog, a special effect

See also
 Smaug (disambiguation)